Marcel Weiss (1912–2009) was a French cinematographer. He began his career as a cameraman during the 1930s, before graduating to director of photography.

Selected filmography
 A Cage of Nightingales (1945)
 Operation Swallow (1948)
 Scandal on the Champs-Élysées (1949)
 Thirst of Men (1950)
 My Brother from Senegal (1953)
 This Man Is Dangerous (1953)
 The Blonde Gypsy (1953)
 One Bullet Is Enough (1954)
 OSS 117 Is Not Dead (1957)
 The Amorous Corporal (1958)
 Mimi Pinson (1958)
 The Long Absence (1961)
 Codine (1963)
 Un linceul n'a pas de poches (1974)

References

Bibliography
 Smith, Allison. French Cinema in the 1970s: The Echoes of May. Manchester University Press, 2005.

External links

1912 births
2009 deaths
Cinematographers from Paris